Stade Pater is a multi-use stadium in Pirae, Tahiti, in French Polynesia, France.  It is currently used mostly for football matches.  The stadium holds 11,700.

References

Football venues in French Polynesia
Athletics (track and field) venues in French Polynesia
French Polynesia
Sport in Tahiti
A.S. Pirae